The West Bengal State Council of Technical & Vocational Education and Skill Development() (Erstwhile West Bengal State Council of Vocational Education and Training)()  is a statutory body under the West Bengal state government for administration and examining vocational courses in West Bengal. The courses are offered from various affiliated institutions, including Higher Secondary, Secondary Schools and Polytechnic Colleges across the state. Its headquarters are in Karigori Bhavan in Kolkata.

History
Before 2005 West Bengal Council of Higher Secondary Education was in the administration of vocational education in West Bengal. Vocational Stream emerged as an Autonomous body in 2005 and running successfully since then in West Bengal. On 5 December 2013 the Govt. of West Bengal brought a bill in Assembly. This bill passed on 15 July 2015 in the Assembly and a new Council was formed in the name of “West Bengal State Council of Technical and Vocational Education and Skill Development” by merging ‘West Bengal State Council of Technical Education’ and ‘West Bengal State Council of Vocational Education and Training.’Presently this stream is equivalent to General Stream of H.S. Education.

Curriculum
The Higher Secondary Course offered by the Council consist of two parts, Class XI and Class XII. Sectionsinclude  Engineering and Technology, Agriculture, Business and Commerce, Home Science. Subjects under Higher Secondary Examination level are

 1st Language
 2nd Language

Language group is common to all. Available languages are Bengali, Hindi, Nepali, and English.

Also common subjects like Technical Drawing, Physics, Chemistry, Mathematics
Also certificate course for VIII pass students is also offered from this council under various affiliated Institutes. These courses are-

Engineering and technology 

 Civil Construction and Maintenance Technology
 Automobile Mechanics
 Air-Conditioner and Refrigerator Mechanic
 Computer Assembly & Maintenance
 Computer Application
 IT Enabled Services
 Maintenance & Repair of Electrical Domestic Appliances
 Consumer & Industrial Electronics Mechanics

Agriculture 

 Marine Fisheries
 Ornamental Fish Culture
 Mushroom Cultivation
 Composting

Business 

 Marketing and salesmanship
 Modern Office Practice
 Library and Information Service
 Travel & Tourism

Home Science 

 Tailoring
 Commercial Art
 Jori and Kantha Embroidery
 Toy making
 Interior Decoration

Business and Commerce 

 Rural Marketing
 Marketing

Paramedical 

 Blood collection assistant
 Health worker

Facility to Diploma Engineering
Students can apply to enter in 2nd year of Diploma Engineering of West Bengal State Council of Technical Education through a VOCLET (Lateral Entry) examination after passing (X+2) level course of WBSCVET.

References

Education in West Bengal
2005 establishments in West Bengal
Educational boards based in Kolkata
State agencies of West Bengal
Government agencies established in 2005